The Ambassador Extraordinary and Plenipotentiary of the Russian Federation to the Republic of Bulgaria is the official representative of the President and the Government of the Russian Federation to the President and the Government of Bulgaria.

The ambassador and his staff work at large in the Embassy of Russia in Sofia. There are consulates general in Rousse and Varna. The post of Russian Ambassador to Bulgaria is currently held by Eleonora Mitrofanova, incumbent since 15 January 2021.

History of diplomatic relations

Diplomatic relations between the Russian Empire and the Principality of Bulgaria were established on 7 July 1879, in the aftermath of the Russo-Turkish War of 1877–1878, which established a de facto independent Bulgarian state. Bulgarian policy thereafter diverged from Russian interests, and after Bulgarian success in the Serbo-Bulgarian War in 1885, Russia compelled Alexander to abdicate the following year, and diplomatic relations were interrupted. They were restored in 1896.

Diplomatic relations were again suspended on 6 October 1915, after Bulgaria's entry into the First World War on the side of the Central Powers. After the withdrawal of Russia from the war and the signing of the Treaty of Brest-Litovsk on 3 March 1918, diplomatic relations were nominally restored between the Russian government, now under Bolshevik leadership, and the Central Powers. Stefan Chaproshikov was appointed to head the Bulgarian mission to the Russian Soviet Federative Socialist Republic, and was able to present his credentials to Yakov Sverdlov, Chairman of the Central Executive Committee of the All-Russian Congress of Soviets. With the defeat of the Central Powers in 1918, the Treaty of Brest-Litovsk was formally abrogated on 13 November 1918 by the All-Russian Central Executive Committee, and diplomatic relations were again suspended.

Diplomatic relations between the Soviet Union and Bulgaria were established at the mission level in 1934, and continued during the Second World War, despite the fact the Bulgaria was nominally part of the Tripartite Pact alongside Germany, Italy and Japan. On 5 September 1944, with the Red Army advancing towards the Balkans, the Soviet Union declared war on Bulgaria. Bulgarian forces offered little resistance to the advancing Soviets, and the country was occupied. Relations between the Soviet Union and Bulgaria were restored in August 1945, and on 6 January 1946 an agreement was reached to upgrade the diplomatic missions into embassies. With the dissolution of the Soviet Union in 1991, the Soviet ambassador continued as representative of the Russian Federation.

List of representatives (1878 – present)

Representatives of the Russian Empire to Bulgaria (1878 – 1915)

Representatives of the Soviet Union to Bulgaria (1934 – 1991)

Representatives of the Russian Federation to Bulgaria (1991 – present)

References

 
Bulgaria
Russia